The name Beulah has been used for three tropical cyclones in the Atlantic Ocean

 Tropical Storm Beulah (1959), formed in the Bay of Campeche, just off the Mexican coastline
 Hurricane Beulah (1963), did not make landfall
 Hurricane Beulah (1967), Category 5 hurricane; struck the Yucatán peninsula of Mexico, crossed the Gulf of Mexico and made second landfall near the Mexico–Texas border

Atlantic hurricane set index articles